Darren Briais is an Australian DJ.

The single "I Feel It" by DJ Darren Briais vs. DJ Peewee Ferris was nominated for the ARIA Award for Best Dance Release and reached #20 on the ARIA singles chart.

Discography

Singles

Awards and nominations

ARIA Music Awards
The ARIA Music Awards is an annual awards ceremony that recognises excellence, innovation, and achievement across all genres of Australian music.

|-
| 1996 || "I Feel It" || ARIA Award for Best Dance Release || 
|-

References

Australian electronic musicians
Living people
Year of birth missing (living people)